The Diocese of Nocera Inferiore-Sarno (Latin: Dioecesis Nucerina Paganorum-Sarnensis) is a Roman Catholic diocese located in the Campania region of Italy. It is a suffragan of the Archdiocese of Salerno-Campagna-Acerno.

Bishops

Diocese of Nocera de' Pagani
Erected: 4th century
Latin Name: Nucerina Paganorum
Metropolitan: Archdiocese of Salerno-Acerno

Antonio Bolognini (1438–1444 Appointed, Bishop of Foligno) 
Giovanni Marcolini, O.F.M. (1444–1465 Died) 
Pietro Strambone, O.P. (1479–1503 Died) 
Bernardino Orsini (1503–1511 Died) 
Domenico Giacobazzi (1511–1517 Resigned) 
Andrea Giacobazzi (1517–1524 Died) 
Domenico Giacobazzi (2nd time)(1524–1528 Died) 
Paolo Giovio (il Vecchio) (1528–1552 Died) 
Giulio Giovio (1552–1560 Resigned) 
Paolo Giovio (il Giovane) (1560–1585 Died) 
Sulpizio Costantino (1585–1602 Died) 
Simone Lunadori (1602–1610 Died) 
Stefano de Vicari, O.P. (1610–1620 Died) 
Francesco Trivulzio (1621–1631 Died) 
Ippolito Franconi (1632–1653 Died) 
Bonaventura D'Avalos, O.S.A. (1654–1659 Resigned) 
Felice Gabrielli, O.F.M. Conv. (1659–1684 Died) 
Emiddio Lenti (1685–1691 Died) 
Sebastiano Perissi (1692–1700 Appointed, Bishop of Grosseto) 
Giovanbattista Carafa (1700–1715 Died) 
Niccolò di Domenico (1718–1744 Died) 
Gherardo Antonio Volpe (1744–1768 Died) 
Benedetto Maria dei Monti Sanfelice, O.S.B. (1768–1806 Died) 
Agnello Giuseppe d'Auria Loffredo (1834–1860 Died) 
Michele Adinolfi (1860–1863 Died) 
...
Raffaele Ammirante (1871–1881 Died) 
Francesco Vitagliano (1882–1885 Resigned) 
Luigi del Forno (1885–1913 Died) 
Giuseppe Romeo (1913–1935 Died) 
Teodorico de Angelis (1936–1951 Resigned) 
Fortunato Zoppas (1952–1964 Resigned) 
Jolando Nuzzi (1971–1986 Died)

Diocese of Nocera Inferiore-Sarno
30 September 1986: United with the territory of the historical Diocese of Sarno that was previously merged into the Diocese of Cava e Sarno

Gioacchino Illiano (1987–2011 Retired) 
Giuseppe Giudice (2011–)

Notes

Nocera Inferiore
Roman Catholic Diocese of Nocera Inferiore-Sarno